MeteorCity Records is an American record label founded in 1997 by Jadd Shickler and Aaron Emmel in Albuquerque, New Mexico. With the release of its compilation album Welcome to MeteorCity showcasing young unsigned Kyuss-like bands, MeteorCity helped launch the stoner rock genre and many of the genre's first bands, plus side projects from members of well-known bands including The Atomic Bitchwax and Hermano. MeteorCity Records was one of the first record labels dedicated exclusively to Stoner rock, doom metal, sludge metal, drone metal and psychedelic rock.

History 
MeteorCity was founded in September 1997 by Jadd Shickler (of band Spiritu) and Aaron Emmel in Albuquerque, New Mexico. The first incarnation was an online store called All That's Heavy, which sold hard-to-find releases by stoner rock bands Kyuss, Monster Magnet, and Fu Manchu. They soon expanded the catalog to include artists that stylistically fit with the first three bands.

After running the online store for about half a year, they were contacted by the former proprietor for the first Kyuss fan website. He recommended MeteorCity do a compilation of unsigned bands that Kyuss fans would enjoy. MeteorCity Records was formed, and the result of the suggestion was the compilation Welcome to MeteorCity, which was released in May of that year. The compilation included both established desert and stoner rock acts, including new bands established by John Garcia of Kyuss (now in Unida), Ed Mundell of Monster Magnet, and Pete Stahl. The album was the first time that the bands Sixty Watt Shaman, Lowrider, The Atomic Bitchwax, Dozer, Goatsnake, Drag Pack, and Los Natas were heard on a record. According to MeteorCity founders,

Around this time a MeteorCity intern purportedly coined the term desert rock to describe the burgeoning genre, which is still used interchangeably with the more known descriptor "stoner rock". Stoner rock originates from the title of the 1997 Roadrunner Records compilation Burn One Up! Music for Stoners.

After the first compilation was released, that summer the label received a call from customer Henry Vasquez, who had the members of the band Nebula in his store. The bandmembers, which included founding Fu Manchu members Eddie Glass (guitar) and Ruben Romano (drums), had asked to talk with them. The band agreed to release their EP on MeteorCity, and MeteorCity offered to fund the band's recording session with Jack Endino. The result was MeteorCity's second release, the Nebula/Lowrider EP, which also featured tracks by Swedish band Lowrider. In 1999, the label released Unida/Dozer, a joint EP featuring the first non-compilation tracks by Unida and Swedish band Dozer.

The label soon signed a number of musicians and bands from the Palm Desert Scene of desert rock, such as Hermano and Unida, both featuring former Kyuss frontman John Garcia. They have also released albums by The Atomic Bitchwax, which features Monster Magnet guitarist Ed Mundell, and The Hidden Hand and Spirit Caravan led by Obsessed/St. Vitus guitarist Scott "Wino" Weinreich. In 2002 they released the first album by the Orquesta Del Desierto, which featured key members of the major desert rock bands.

Change of ownership 
As the scene continued to develop, the popular website StonerRock.com was launched by Dan Beland in 1999. The website became a central community hub for heavy music artists and fans. In March 2001, MeteorCity licensed StonerRock.com to take over management and operations of All That's Heavy. All That's Heavy's catalog grew to become the largest online store of stoner rock, doom metal, sludge metal, drone metal and psychedelic rock. MeteorCity in turn began to focus more on the label. All That's Heavy was officially sold to Dan Beland and Melanie Streko of StonerRock.com on May 15, 2004, and renamed All That is Heavy.

In 2007, Shickler and Emmel sold MeteorCity Records to Dan Beland and Melanie Streko as well. Their farewell release was a three disc compilation disc titled ...And Back to Earth Again.  MeteorCity continued to release albums by new bands, including full LPs from Black Pyramid, Elder, Snail and Freedom Hawk, among others. In 2010 StonerRock.com was taken offline, and MeteorCity Records became the official label for All That is Heavy. On September 1, 2014, Melanie Streko resigned from All That is Heavy and MeteorCity Records. Three years later, on August 1, 2017, All That is Heavy was sold to Casey and Taylor Kelch of Katy, Texas.

Artists 

 Abdullah
 Ararat
 The Atomic Bitchwax
 Black NASA
 Blind Dog
 Black Pyramid
 Dead Man
 Dozer
 Egypt
 Eighteen Wheels Burning
 Elder
 Eternal Elysium
 Farflung
 Flood
 Freedom Hawk
 Gallery of Mites
 Hermano
 The Hidden Hand
 Humo Del Cairo
 Leeches of Lore
 Let the Night Roar
 Los Natas
 Lowrider
 Misdemeanor
 The Mushroom River Band
 Nebula
 New Keepers of The Water Towers
 Nightstalker
 The Obsessed
 Olde Growth
 Orquesta del Desierto
 The Quill
 The Ribeye Brothers
 SardoniS
 Scene Killer
 Snail
 Solace
 Solarized
 Spirit Caravan
 Spiritu
 Truckfighters
 Unida
 Valkyrie
 Village of Dead Roads
 WhiteBuzz

Release history

References

Further reading

External links 
MeteorCity Records
All That is Heavy

American record labels
Doom metal record labels